The Lăzarea (also: Chiuruț or Chiuruțul Mare) is a right tributary of the river Mureș in Transylvania, Romania. It flows through the village Lăzarea, and joins the Mureș near the village Remetea.

Its Hungarian name contains the archaic word "szár" for "bold", so the name  means "Boldmountain Creek".

References

Rivers of Romania
Rivers of Harghita County